Three ships of United States Navy were named USS Corry for William Merrill Corry, Jr.

 , a Clemson-class destroyer, was commissioned in 1921 and decommissioned in 1930.
 , a Gleaves-class destroyer, served from 1941 until she was sunk on D-Day, 6 June 1944.
 , a Gearing-class destroyer, was launched in 1945. In 1981, the ship was transferred to Greece and renamed Kriezis.

United States Navy ship names